Jan Ordoš (born September 18, 1996) is a Czech professional ice hockey player. He is currently playing for Bílí Tygři Liberec of the Czech Extraliga.

Ordoš made his Czech Extraliga debut playing with HC Bílí Tygři Liberec during the 2015-16 Czech Extraliga season.

References

External links

1996 births
Living people
HC Bílí Tygři Liberec players
Czech ice hockey forwards
Sportspeople from Ústí nad Labem
Czech expatriate ice hockey players in Sweden